The Panama Olympic Committee is the National Olympic Committee representing Panama. It is also the body responsible for Panama's representation at the Olympic Games.

History 
Comité Olímpico de Panamá was founded in 1934 and recognised by the International Olympic Committee in 1947.

See also
Panama at the Olympics

References

External links
 Official website

National Olympic Committees
Oly
Panama at the Olympics
1934 establishments in Panama
Sports organizations established in 1934